Haigunda is a village located in an island in Sharavathi river, Honnavara taluk, Karnataka.

Antiquity
Haigunda, previously known as Paivegundapura, is located on an island in the river Sharavathi in Uttara Kannada district and it at a distance of 20 km from Honnavara.
The village is known for pre-historic art and Yaksha stone statue found in Haigunda is dated around first-second century A.D. and the statue is 1.80 meters tall. Yaksha statue is locally called as Babri and as on 2014, it is in a state of semi-neglect.  There are also three other statues which are slightly disfigured and one is Mahavishnu and two of them have Buddhist look. Legend says that Kadamba king Mayuravarma brought 32 Havyaka families from Ahichatra (located in present-day  Uttar Pradesh) to Talagunda to perform Vedic rituals. However, the inscription found at Talagunda mentions they were brought to agrahara in Talagunda.  There were several sacrificial altars in the inland and bricks used for them are still found and used for other building purposes by local people.

References

Villages in Uttara Kannada district